George Thomas Smith (born 14 August 1996) is an English footballer who plays as a left back for  club Guiseley. He has previously played in the English Football League for Barnsley, Crawley Town, Northampton Town and Chesterfield, and in the National League for Bradford Park Avenue, Gateshead, Dover Athletic, Boston United, Harrogate Town and Darlington.

Career

Barnsley 
Smith began his career with Barnsley, progressing through the club's academy and signed a professional contract in June 2014. He made his Football League debut on 26 December 2014 in a 1–0 defeat against Preston North End.

He made four League Two appearances during a month's loan at Crawley Town early in 2016, and was not offered a new contract by Barnsley when his existing deal expired in June 2016.

Gateshead 
On 29 June 2016, Smith signed for Gateshead on a one-year deal ahead of the 2016–17 National League season. He made his league debut for the club on 6 August against Chester and scored his first senior goal in a 3–0 win over Southport on 4 February 2017.

Northampton Town 
In May 2017, Smith signed a two-year contract with Northampton Town. He made his debut on 9 September against Doncaster Rovers, assisting Matt Crooks with the only goal of the match after 21 seconds, the quickest goal ever scored at Sixfields Stadium.

Chesterfield 
Smith left Northampton on 31 January 2018 to sign an 18-month deal with League Two club Chesterfield; the fee was undisclosed. Following two loan spells during the 2018–19 season, at Dover Athletic, where he made his debut in a 2–1 loss against Barnet on 1 September 2018, and at Boston United, Smith was released by Chesterfield when his contract expired.

Harrogate Town
On 12 June 2019, Harrogate Town announced the signing of Smith.

Return to Gateshead
On 9 June 2020, Smith rejoined Gateshead on a one-year contract. He made 12 National League North appearances before the season was curtailed because of the COVID-19 pandemic, and was released when his contract expired.

Darlington
Smith followed full-back partner Kallum Griffiths to National League North rivals Darlington for the 2021–22 season. On 11 May 2022, Darlington announced that Smith was one of ten players released by the club.

Guiseley
On 20 May 2022, Smith signed a one-year contract with Northern Premier League Premier Division club Guiseley.

Career statistics

References

External links
 
 

1996 births
Living people
Footballers from Barnsley
English footballers
Association football defenders
Barnsley F.C. players
Bradford (Park Avenue) A.F.C. players
Crawley Town F.C. players
Gateshead F.C. players
Northampton Town F.C. players
Chesterfield F.C. players
Dover Athletic F.C. players
Boston United F.C. players
Harrogate Town A.F.C. players
Darlington F.C. players
Guiseley A.F.C. players
English Football League players
National League (English football) players